The 2011–12 Senior Women's Challenger Trophy was the third edition of India's 50 over Women's Challenger Trophy. Three teams made up of the best players in India competed in a round-robin group, with the top two advancing to the final. Matches were held at the Reliance Cricket Stadium and the Moti Bagh Stadium in Vadodara across four days in October 2011. The tournament was won by India Red, who beat India Blue  in the final by 41 runs.

Competition format
The three teams played in a round-robin group, playing each other team once, with the top two advancing to the final. Matches were played using a 50 over format.

The group worked on a points system with positions with the group being based on the total points. Points were awarded as follows:

Win: 4 points. 
Tie: 2 points. 
Loss: 0 points.
No Result/Abandoned: 2 points.

If points in the final table are equal, teams are separated by their Net Run Rate.

Squads

Source: CricketArchive

Standings

Source: CricketArchive

Group stage

Final

References

2011–12 Indian women's cricket
2011-12
Domestic cricket competitions in 2011–12
Senior Women's Challenger Trophy